Basilica of Our Lady Help of Christians could refer to:

Basilica of Our Lady Help of Christians, Belmont
Basilica of Our Lady Help of Christians, Filippsdorf
Basilica of Our Lady Help of Christians, Shanghai
Basilica of Our Lady Help of Christians, Turin